Jennifer Weiss is a film producer. She co-founded Film Farm Productions with Simone Urdl.

Filmography 
 Luck (2003)
 Queen of the Night (2014)
 Octavio Is Dead! (2018)
 Falls Around Her (2018)
 Guest of Honour (2019)
 The Middle Man (2021)

Recognition 
 2008 Genie Award for Best Motion Picture - Away from Her - Won (shared with Daniel Iron, Simone Urdl)
 2003 Genie Award for Best Live Action Short Drama - I Shout Love - Won (shared with Meredith Caplan, Sarah Polley)

External links 
 

Canadian film producers
Year of birth missing (living people)
Living people
Canadian Screen Award winners
Canadian women film producers